The 1966 Rhode Island gubernatorial election was held on November 8, 1966. Incumbent Republican John Chafee defeated Democratic nominee Horace E. Hobbs with 63.30% of the vote.

General election

Candidates
John Chafee, Republican
Horace E. Hobbs, Democratic

Results

References

1966
Rhode Island
Gubernatorial
November 1966 events in the United States